Tha Sao is a tambon (subdistrict) of Mueang Uttaradit District, in Uttaradit Province, Thailand. In 2020 it had a total population of 14,691 people.

Administration

Central administration
The tambon is subdivided into 10 administrative villages (muban).

Local administration
The area of the subdistrict is shared by 2 local governments.
the town (Thesaban Mueang) Uttaradit (เทศบาลเมืองอุตรดิตถ์)
the subdistrict municipality (Thesaban Tambon) Tha Sao (เทศบาลตำบลท่าเสา)

References

External links
Thaitambon.com on Tha Sao

Tambon of Uttaradit province
Populated places in Uttaradit province